Daniel Stewart Reid (30 October 1867 – 6 May 1952) was a New Zealand politician of the Reform Party.

Early life
Reid was born in Drury in 1867, some distance south of Auckland. His parent had arrived in New Zealand from Argyllshire in Scotland in circa 1865. His parents were Margaret and Walter Reid, but his father's obituary published in the Auckland Star in July 1925 erroneously talks of Andrew Reid. The family lived in Drury, and then in Wairoa in the Hawke's Bay Region.

From approximately age eight, Reid lived at Tuhikaramea near present-day Temple View in the Waipa District. He married Margaret Donnet Hodgson on 8 April 1897.

Political career

Reid was involved in local affairs and served as chairman of the Waipa County Council, as a member of the Tuhikaramea Road Board and school committees, and as a member of the No. 2 District Highways Board and the Central Electric Power board. When the Rural Counties' Association formed in 1925, Reid was elected onto the provisional executive.

Reid was chosen as the official candidate for the Reform Party in early September 1925 for the  electorate. He then defeated Lee Martin of the Labour Party for the Raglan electorate in 1931, but lost Raglan to Martin with the landslide to Labour in 1935.

Later life and death
In 1935, he was awarded the King George V Silver Jubilee Medal. Reid died on 6 May 1952 and was buried at Paterangi Cemetery. His wife died in July 1959 and was buried in the same grave.

References

|-

1867 births
1952 deaths
Reform Party (New Zealand) MPs
New Zealand MPs for North Island electorates
Members of the New Zealand House of Representatives
Unsuccessful candidates in the 1935 New Zealand general election
Unsuccessful candidates in the 1928 New Zealand general election